Ya'akov Cahan or Kahan (born 26 June 1881; died 20 November 1960) was an Israeli poet, playwright, translator, writer and Hebrew linguist.

Biography 
Ya'akov Cahan was born in Slutsk, in the Russian Empire, now Belarus. He immigrated to the British Mandate of Palestine in 1934.

Awards 
 In 1938, Cahan was awarded the Bialik Prize for Literature.
 In 1953 and again in 1958, he was awarded the Israel Prize, for literature.
 In 1956, he received the Tchernichovsky Prize for exemplary translation, for translations from the German of the first part of Goethe's Faust and other Goethe's works, Torquato Tasso and Iphigenia in Tauris, as well as a selection of poems by Heinrich Heine.

See also 
List of Israel Prize recipients
List of Bialik Prize recipients

References

External links
 

1881 births
1960 deaths
People from Slutsk
People from Slutsky Uyezd
Belarusian Jews
Soviet emigrants to Mandatory Palestine
Jews in Mandatory Palestine
Israeli people of Belarusian-Jewish descent
Israeli translators
Israel Prize in literature recipients
Israeli poets
Israeli male dramatists and playwrights
20th-century translators
20th-century poets
20th-century Israeli dramatists and playwrights
Jewish translators
Translators of Johann Wolfgang von Goethe